Corin William Redgrave (16 July 19396 April 2010) was an English actor and left-wing socialist activist.

Early life
Redgrave was born on 16 July 1939 in Marylebone, London, the only son and middle child of actors Michael Redgrave and Rachel Kempson. He was educated at Westminster School and King's College, Cambridge.

Career
Redgrave played a wide range of character roles on film, television and stage.

On stage, he was known for performances by Shakespeare (such as Much Ado About Nothing, Henry IV, Part 1, Antony and Cleopatra, and The Tempest) and Noël Coward (a highly successful revival of A Song At Twilight co-starring his sister Vanessa Redgrave and his second wife, Kika Markham).

For his role as the prison warden Boss Whalen in the Royal National Theatre production of Tennessee Williams's Not About Nightingales, Redgrave was nominated for an Evening Standard Award, and after a successful transfer of the production to New York, he received a Tony Award nomination for Best Actor in a Play, in 1999. Two years later he starred in the original London production of The General from America as Benedict Arnold. When the play transferred to Broadway the following season Redgrave switched roles and portrayed George Washington .

In 2005, Redgrave had just finished an engagement playing the lead in King Lear with the Royal Shakespeare Company in London when he suffered a severe heart attack. In 2008, he returned to the stage in a highly praised portrayal of Oscar Wilde in the one-man-play De Profundis. In 2009, he starred in Trumbo, which opened only hours after the death of his niece, Natasha Richardson.

On screen, he was cast in such films as A Man for All Seasons (1966) as Thomas More's son-in-law, William Roper; Excalibur (1981) as the doomed Cornwall; In the Name of the Father (1993) as the corrupt lead police investigator; Persuasion (TV, 1995) as the foolish Sir Walter Eliot; and Four Weddings and a Funeral (1994) as Hamish, the fiancé of Andie MacDowell's character.

Redgrave appeared in British television programmes such as Ultraviolet, The Vice, Trial & Retribution, Shameless, Foyle's War, The Relief of Belsen, The Ice House and the Emmy Award-winning telefilm The Girl in the Cafe, in which he played the prime minister. He took the lead part of Sir George Grey in the New Zealand TV miniseries The Governor (1977).

He wrote a play called Blunt Speaking, in which he performed at the Minerva Theatre (a second stage of the Chichester Festival Theatre) between 23 July - 10 August 2002.

Politics
Redgrave was a lifelong activist in far-left politics. With his elder sister Vanessa, he was a prominent member of the Workers' Revolutionary Party. After the WRP's collapse, he was involved with the Marxist Party, which the two siblings founded.

Redgrave and his second wife, Kika Markham, expressed support for activist group Viva Palestina, led by British MP George Galloway, attempting to break the blockade of the Gaza Strip. He was also a defender of the interests of the Romani people.

Family

Redgrave was part of the third generation of a theatrical dynasty spanning four generations. His parents were Sir Michael Redgrave and Rachel Kempson; Vanessa and Lynn Redgrave were his sisters. His first marriage was to Deirdre Deline Hamilton-Hill (1939–1997). They had a daughter, actress Jemma Redgrave, and a son, Luke, a camera operator and production assistant. Redgrave and Hamilton-Hill divorced in 1975. Redgrave and Kika Markham married in 1985 in Wandsworth, London, and remained together until Redgrave's death. The couple had two sons, Harvey (born 1979) and Arden (born 1983).

He wrote a memoir about his strained relationship with his father, Michael Redgrave - My Father, which incorporates passages from Michael's diaries. It also reveals his father's bisexuality.

Health problems and death

Redgrave was diagnosed with prostate cancer in 2000, which continued to affect him until he died in 2010. In June 2005, his family said he was in critical but stable condition in hospital following a severe heart attack at a public meeting in Basildon, Essex. In March 2009, Redgrave returned to the London stage playing the title role in Trumbo, based on the life of the blacklisted Hollywood screenwriter Dalton Trumbo. On the opening night, Redgrave dedicated his performance to the memory of his niece Natasha Richardson, who had died earlier that week in a skiing accident.

He died on 6 April 2010 in St George's Hospital, Tooting, South West London. His funeral was held on 12 April 2010 at St Paul's, Covent Garden, London, and he was interred on the eastern side of Highgate Cemetery.

His sister Lynn Redgrave died of breast cancer on 2 May 2010, less than a month after her brother. Markham's memoir of her husband, Our Time of Day: My Life with Corin Redgrave, was published in 2014.

Select stage work

Henry IV Part I
Anthony and Cleopatra
The Seagull
Not About Nightingales
A Song at Twilight
The General From America
De Profundis
Trumbo
The Norman Conquests

Filmography

References

External links

BBC Radio Plays by Corin Redgrave
Times obituary
BBC News obituary
Obituary in Socialist Worker
Obituary on the World Socialist Web Site

1939 births
2010 deaths
Burials at Highgate Cemetery
20th-century English male actors
21st-century English male actors
Male actors from London
Alumni of King's College, Cambridge
British Trotskyists
Deaths from cancer in England
Deaths from prostate cancer
English activists
English communists
English male film actors
English male stage actors
English male television actors
People educated at Westminster School, London
People from Marylebone
English male Shakespearean actors
Workers Revolutionary Party (UK) members
Redgrave family
British political party founders